The Église Notre-Dame-du-Mont is a Roman Catholic church in Marseille.

Location
It is located in the 6th arrondissement of Marseille. The exact address is 1 rue de Lodi in Marseille. It is also located on a town square called Place Notre-Dame-du-Mont.

History
A smaller church was built in 1586, where sailors would bring their ex-votos. Over time, this tradition was moved to Notre-Dame de la Garde.

In 1823-1824, the current church building was constructed in the neoclassical style.

In 1839, Frédéric Chopin (1810-1849) played on the pipe organ inside the church, which is still there.

It has four paintings by Barthélemy Chasse (1659-1720): La fuite en Égypte, L'atelier de Nazareth, L'adoration des bergers and Le mariage de la Vierge. It also has one painting by Dominique Papety (1815–1849): Christ en majesté.

At present
The church building is open every day from 10AM to 12PM, and from 4PM to 6PM. Mass is said every weekday at 8:30AM, every Saturday at 6:30PM, and every Sunday at 10AM. The rosary takes place every at 5:30PM except Sundays, and the vespers take place every Wednesday at 7PM.

The current vicar is Fr Jean-Paul Sorragi, and the deacon is Philippe Chollat.

Gallery

References

6th arrondissement of Marseille
Roman Catholic churches in Marseille
19th-century Roman Catholic church buildings in France
Neoclassical church buildings in France